The 2009–10 Northern Iowa Panthers men's basketball team represented the University of Northern Iowa in the 2009-10 NCAA Division I men's basketball season. The team, which plays in the Missouri Valley Conference (MVC), was led by fourth-year head coach Ben Jacobson and played their home games at the McLeod Center. They went 15–3 during the regular conference season to win the regular season championship. The Panthers also won the 2010 Missouri Valley Conference men's basketball tournament to earn the conference's automatic bid to the 2010 NCAA Division I men's basketball tournament. They earned a 9 seed in the Midwest Region where they defeated 8 seed UNLV in the first round and upset the overall 1 seed Kansas in the second round to advance to the Sweet Sixteen at Edward Jones Dome in St. Louis.

While they lost in their next game to Michigan State, they got a unique parting gift. Because the NCAA has been increasingly using non-traditional basketball venues in recent NCAA tournaments, it has been building new courts for its regional sites and then selling them to schools in need of a court. UNI purchased the court on which the Panthers played in their loss to the Spartans, and installed it at McLeod Center for the 2010–11 season.

Roster

Schedule and results
Source

|-
!colspan=9 style=| Exhibition

|-
!colspan=9 style=| Regular Season

|-
!colspan=9 style=| Missouri Valley tournament

|-
!colspan=10 style=| NCAA tournament

References

Northern Iowa
Northern Iowa Panthers men's basketball seasons
Northern Iowa
Panth
Panth